Ek Khiladi Bawan Pattey (Hindi: एक खिलाड़ी बावन पत्ते) is a 1972 Bollywood film starring Dev Kumar, Vinod Khanna, Tarun Bose and Laxmi Chhaya.

Cast

Dev Kumar	as	Shekhar
Vinod Khanna	as	Inspector Vinod (Pushpa's Husband) (Special Appearance)
Padmarani	as	Pushpa (Shekhar's Sister)
Naqi Jehan	as	Rekha
Laxmi Chhaya	as	Bijli
Tarun Bose	as	Dinanath (Shekhar's Father)
Mohan Choti	as	Jackpot (Shekhar's Friend)
Veeru Devgan	as	Jaggu (Vikram's sidekick)
C.S. Dubey	as	Bansidhar
Dulari	as	Shekhar's Mother
Satyendra Kapoor	as	Inspector
Ravi Khanna	as	Vikram
Mehmood Junior	as	Shekhar's Friend
Sajjan	as	Diwaan Saheb (Rekha's Father)
Padmini Kolhapure	as	Young Pushpa (uncredited)
Brahm Bhardwaj as News Editor

Music

References 

http://www.hindigeetmala.net/song/ek_khilari_baawan_pattey.htm

External links

Films scored by Sonik-Omi
1972 films
1970s Hindi-language films